A ballot box is a temporarily sealed container, usually a square box though sometimes a tamper resistant bag, with a narrow slot in the top sufficient to accept a ballot paper in an election but which prevents anyone from accessing the votes cast until the close of the voting period. A ballot drop box allows voters who have received a ballot by mail to submit it for counting in a self-service fashion.

Usage
It will usually be located in a polling station although in some countries, notably Ireland, Italy and Russia, there may also be ballot boxes that are taken to people's homes where they would otherwise be unable to travel to the polling station. When very large ballot papers are used, there may be a feeder mechanism to assist in the deposit of the paper into the box.

Transparent ballot boxes may be used in order for people to be able to witness that the box is empty prior to the start of the election (i.e. not stuffed with fraudulent votes).

At the close of the election all boxes can be taken to a single location for tallying (the count) and the result declared. Alternately the boxes can be tallied at the polling station, with individual stations announcing their results to be tallied (known as precinct count).

Ballot boxes are obsolete in some jurisdictions because of the increase in paperless electronic voting.

The word ballot derives from voting systems based upon the use of a small ball instead of a voting paper: see blackball.

History
In the Roman Republic, each voter initially gave his vote orally to an official who made a note of it on an official tablet, but later in the Republic, the secret ballot was introduced, and the voter recorded his vote with a stylus on a wax-covered boxwood tablet, then dropped the completed ballot in the sitella or urna (voting urn), sometimes also called cista.

The first British secret ballot using ballot papers and a ballot box was held in Pontefract on 15 August 1872, under the terms of the recently enacted Ballot Act 1872.  In a ministerial by-election following his appointment as Chancellor of the Duchy of Lancaster, Hugh Childers was re-elected as MP for Pontefract.  The original ballot box, sealed in wax with a liquorice stamp, is held at Pontefract Museum.

Photo gallery

See also
Ballot
Election fraud
Four boxes of liberty
Secret ballot

References

External links 
 

Elections terminology
Containers